The Canada Media Fund (CMF) is a public-private partnership founded on April 1, 2010 by the Department of Canadian Heritage and the Canadian cable industry. It is used to fund the creation of original Canadian content and support the Canadian media industry. The fund is composed of contributions made by Canadian broadcasting distribution undertakings (BDUs)—as mandated by the Canadian Radio-television and Telecommunications Commission (CRTC)—and the federal government. It funds roughly $750 million annually.

History 
The creation of the Canada Media Fund was announced by Minister of Heritage, James Moore in a speech given on March 9, 2009. It was created as a merger between the Canadian Television Fund (CTF) and the Canada New Media Fund. The fund's origins are rooted to the Canadian Radio-television and Telecommunications Commission's formation of the Cable Production Fund in 1995. From this initiation, the fund was transitioned into the Canada Television and Cable Production Fund (1996), the Canadian Television Fund (1998), the Canada New Media Fund (2001), and the Digital Media Pilot Program (2008), where the following year the Canada Media Fund was born. The fund was created as a way to "[modernize] government investments to support Canadian content in the new era of consumer choice, emerging technology, and investing in Canada's future."

Administration structure 
As required by the CRTC, Canadian BDUs are required to contribute 5% of their revenues to the Canada Media Fund. While policy, research and communications rest with the CMF, the day-to-day administration of applications rests with a separate entity, that of the CMF Program Administrator, which is part of Telefilm Canada.

Funded productions
A funded projects database exists on the companies' website.

Television series
Programs produced in association with CMF/FMC include:

Animism: The Gods' Lake (2013)
Baroness von Sketch Show (2011–2018)
Kim's Convenience (2013–2018)
Letterkenny (2012)
Murdoch Mysteries (2010–2018)
Orphan Black (2011)
Schitt's Creek (2014–2020)
Slasher (season 2, 2011)
Still Standing (season 3, 2011)
Stories of Our Elders (2014 web series televised in 2018)
Total Drama (formerly financed by the CTF) (2012–2014)
Vikings (2013–2018)
Degrassi: The Next Generation (2001–2015)

Video games
Video games produced in association with CMF/FMC include:

Consortium
My Singing Monsters
Outlast
Dead by Daylight
The Long Dark
The Low Road
We Happy Few
Chariot
Jotun
The Messenger  
Outward

Encore+

The Canada Media Fund previously operated a YouTube channel called Encore+ in collaboration with Telefilm Canada, Deluxe Toronto, BroadbandTV, Bell Media, and Google Canada. This channel was uniquely dedicated to licensing and making freely available older Canadian content, particularly series and films without an existing streaming service presence or physical home media releases.

The service was launched on November 7, 2017, celebrating the 150th anniversary of Canada.

In early 2022, a separate YouTube channel called Encore Plus was created, for all current and future French-language content. By then Encore+ had also invested in creating tie-in content original to the service that expanded upon the works on its channels, with cast members providing commentary decades after production.

On November 17 and 18, 2022, official platforms announced that after more than five years of availability, the service (now considered a pilot project) was to shut down on November 30th. All media was wiped from both YouTube channels on that date, and the Twitter account and Facebook page with lists of content and discussion were made unavailable.

References

External links 
 
 Department of Canadian Heritage

Television organizations in Canada
Organizations established in 2010
2010 establishments in Canada
2010 mergers and acquisitions
Department of Canadian Heritage